Oxymeris crenulata, common name crenulate auger, is a species of sea snail, a marine gastropod mollusc in the family Terebridae, the auger snails.

The shell of this species has crenulations along the suture, hence the specific name.

Description
Adult shell size varies between 48 mm and 154 mm.

The  ovate, conical shell is whitish, ashy or reddish, often with two brown bands which are sometimes interrupted. The spire is formed of seven or eight distinct whorls, flattened above, furnished with longitudinal, almost perpendicular folds, which are themselves intersected by striae visible only in the interstices of the folds, except towards the base, and upon the whorls at the top of the spire. The upper edge of the whorls is flattened, and bordered by rounded tubercles, which are separated from the longitudinal folds by a deep stria running below them. The ovate aperture is whitish, contracted at the top by a
transverse fold of the left lip. The outer lip is emarginated at its upper edge, marked interiorly with transverse striae in great numbers. The left lip is obliterated and flattened at its summit. It gives rise from the middle to the base to a pretty thick, projecting callosity, in the form of a keel.

This species presents a great number of varieties. In young specimens the color is deeper. The transverse brown bands are more marked, and appear upon all the whorls. The shell has also, proportionally, a more globular form. Other specimens are of a uniform color, have the whorls strongly canaliculated, and the longitudinal folds more approximate.

Distribution
This species is found in the Red Sea and in the Indian Ocean off Aldabra, Chagos, Madagascar, the Mascarene Basin and Tanzania, and in the Pacific Ocean off Mexico.

References

 Melvill, J.C. & Sykes, E.R. (1898). Notes on a second collection of marine shells from the Andaman Islands, with descriptions of new forms of Terebra. Proceedings of the Malacological Society of London. 3: 35–48, pl. 3.
 Bratcher T. & Cernohorsky W.O. (1987). Living terebras of the world. A monograph of the recent Terebridae of the world. American Malacologists, Melbourne, Florida & Burlington, Massachusetts. 240pp
 Drivas, J. & M. Jay (1988). Coquillages de La Réunion et de l'île Maurice
 Terryn Y. (2007). Terebridae: A Collectors Guide. Conchbooks & NaturalArt. 59pp + plates
 Severns, M. (2011). Shells of the Hawaiian Islands - The Sea Shells. Conchbooks, Hackenheim. 564 pp.

External links
 photos of shells of Oxymeris crenulata
 
 Linnaeus, C. (1758). Systema Naturae per regna tria naturae, secundum classes, ordines, genera, species, cum characteribus, differentiis, synonymis, locis. Editio decima, reformata [10th revised edition, vol. 1: 824 pp. Laurentius Salvius: Holmiae]
 Gmelin J.F. (1791). Vermes. In: Gmelin J.F. (Ed.) Caroli a Linnaei Systema Naturae per Regna Tria Naturae, Ed. 13. Tome 1(6). G.E. Beer, Lipsiae [Leipzig. pp. 3021-3910]
 Deshayes, G. P. (1857). Description d'espèces nouvelles du genre Terebra. Journal de Conchyliologie. 6 (1): 65-102
 Deshayes, G. P. (1859). A general review of the genus Terebra, and a description of new species. Proceedings of the Zoological Society of London. (1859) 27: 270-321.
 Fedosov, A. E.; Malcolm, G.; Terryn, Y.; Gorson, J.; Modica, M. V.; Holford, M.; Puillandre, N. (2020). Phylogenetic classification of the family Terebridae (Neogastropoda: Conoidea). Journal of Molluscan Studies. 85(4): 359-388

Terebridae
Gastropods described in 1758
Taxa named by Carl Linnaeus